10th Politburo may refer to:
 10th Politburo of the Chinese Communist Party
 Politburo of the 10th Congress of the Russian Communist Party (Bolsheviks)
 10th Politburo of the Party of Labour of Albania
 11th Politburo of the Communist Party of Czechoslovakia
 10th Politburo of the Socialist Unity Party of Germany
 10th Politburo of the Polish United Workers' Party
 10th Politburo of the Romanian Communist Party
 10th Politburo of the Lao People's Revolutionary Party
 10th Politburo of the Communist Party of Vietnam
 10th Politburo of the League of Communists of Yugoslavia
 10th Politburo of the Hungarian Socialist Workers' Party